Nixon is a village in Norfolk County, Ontario, Canada that is almost exclusively residential. This community is east of the town of Delhi, northwest of the town of Simcoe, southwest of the town of Waterford, and northeast of the hamlet of Pinegrove.

Nixon's earliest known inhabitants, from around the year 1000 until approximately 300–350 years later, were the Algonquin nation. They were noted flint-workers and evidence of their skill in crafting arrowheads is still to be found in open worked field areas surrounding the village. The next wave of inhabitants were the Attawandaron nation, the Neutrals, who occupied the region from about 1350 until their absorption by the Iroquois in the year 1651. The last significant native nation to occupy the area was the Mississaugas.

In 2001, Haldimand-Norfolk was dissolved into two separate single-tier counties. Nixon became part of the newly formed County of Norfolk.

Summary
Nixon has a municipal airport that is classified as a small general aviation aerodrome with no amenities for passenger flight airplanes. The local economy includes a variety of farms and a single office building where Nixon Public School was stationed from the 1950s until the early 2000s. Ever since Nixon Public School was closed due to the provincial government cutbacks on education, Nixon has become a bedroom community for people who can afford to live in a single-family house. No shops or grocery stores operate in this community; which means food must be either purchased directly from a farmer or from a grocery store in Simcoe/Delhi. Private automobiles and taxis are generally found in Nixon for the purpose of commuting as Ride Norfolk mass transit services don't have a bus stop in Nixon.

Most people get their television either through Shaw Direct, Bell Satellite TV or over-the-air. Five channels (CIII-DT, CITY-DT, CICO-DT, CITS-DT, and CKCO-DT) can be picked up reliably using an outdoor antenna while an additional five channels (WYNB-DT, CHCH-DT, CFPL-DT, WICU-DT, and CHCJ-DT) tend to not be as reliable to pick up through an outdoor antenna. There are at least 14 channels that can't be viewed on days that are cloudy, rainy, snowy, or during times of strong winds.

This community is the westernmost community to receive water from the Lynn River; which flows directly into Lake Erie. Water from the Lynn River is considered to be the purest water in Norfolk County because it isn't filtered out by the other creeks and rivers.

Trees surround the hamlet of Nixon help to play a vital role in shading the community from excessive wind and heat during the summer time. However, the forest has dangers of its own like swampland, poison ivy, poison oak and the local population of rattlesnakes.

A gas station was once operated just southeast of Nixon. It appeared to be run-down and operated solely as a private residence even back in the late 1980s. It was an independent gas station with the only little store owned by Mr. Bell.

New Limburg Brewing Company
The former public school was opened as a craft brewery and pub in September 2015. "New Limburg" Brewery is owned and operated by a family from the Netherlands, who brew several different Belgian-style beers. They are open daily until 11:00 P.M. for samples and sales. http://newlimburg.com/  <ref>[http://www.simcoereformer.ca/2014/04/09/microbrewery-coming-to-nixon Microbrewery Coming to Nixon]  at The Simcoe Reformer</ref>

Norfolk County council personally had to approve the land's zoning change from educational to light industrial in order for Norfolk County's third microbrewery to be possible according to their set of by-laws.

Some of the chalkboards from the old Nixon Public School have been preserved and service is available even in the coldest winter months. The beers served at this establishment range from being of average quality to excellent quality. Most customers spend less than 60 minutes in this establishment. Drinking different types of beer is possible in a sampler and the drinks have names like The Black Sheep''. Most of the patrons come in during the daytime when the roads are easily navigable. There is an outdoor patio, in addition, to live music playing throughout the establishment.

Climate
March weather in Nixon was pretty much below freezing until the early-2000s when changing weather patterns replaced the March freezing rain with April-like rain.

The winter of 1975 was the only unusually mild winter in the region from 1897 to 1977. From the late 1990s onwards, winters have become more mild due to changes in climate brought on by global warming. Nixon traditionally belongs to the humid continental climate zone, even with the recent mild winters and warmer dry summers. As in all communities, towns and cities throughout the world, global warming due to human industrial activity has drastically altered the climate of Nixon over the decades.

The warmest summers that Nixon has witnessed occurred in 1998, 2003, 2005, 2006, 2007, 2009 (with the exception of the month of July), 2010, 2012, 2013, 2014, 2015 and 2016.

However, it may be affected by droughts as a by-product of the dislocation of available freshwater and may be forced to rely on desalinated salt water piped in from the Eastern United States. Constructing the proper infrastructure to carry the water hundreds of miles away would take considerable manpower along with significant economic costs and an unprecedented level of cooperation from multiple federal, state/provincial, and municipal governments.

References

External links
 Nixon Air Services
 Map of Nixon, Ontario

Communities in Norfolk County, Ontario